Post Traumatic is the debut solo studio album by Linkin Park vocalist Mike Shinoda. Released on June 15, 2018 under Shinoda's own name instead of his Fort Minor moniker, it is his second solo studio album after Fort Minor's The Rising Tied. The album was announced on March 29, 2018, along with the release of two songs to promote the album, "Crossing a Line" and "Nothing Makes Sense Anymore". "Crossing a Line" and "Make It Up as I Go" were issued to radio stations as the album's two official singles.

Shinoda himself served as the primary producer of the album but with additional production on a few tracks by BASECAMP, Andrew Dawson, and Boonn. Linkin Park guitarist Brad Delson, Blackbear, K.Flay, Deftones lead vocalist Chino Moreno, Machine Gun Kelly, Ross Golan, Kevin Hissink (Boonn), and Grandson helped write some songs, though most were written by Shinoda.

The album contains content Shinoda recorded mostly by himself but additional instruments were played by Linkin Park drummer Rob Bourdon, Darren King, and Boonn with the content having been written by Shinoda after the death of his Linkin Park bandmate Chester Bennington on July 20, 2017. The three songs from the Post Traumatic EP are included as the first three songs of this album.

Background
On January 25, 2018, Shinoda revealed his second project as a solo artist with the release of the Post Traumatic EP, consisting of three tracks focusing on his feelings after the death of his Linkin Park bandmate and longtime friend Chester Bennington, who died by suicide on July 20, 2017. Precisely because of the issues addressed in the songs, Shinoda decided to publish the album in his name, without using his previous pseudonym, Fort Minor.

In early March, he unexpectedly announced that he was working on a solo album, inviting fans to meet him that day in Los Angeles to hear a new song and to join a music video. The inviting fans' event was documented and featured on the music video of "Crossing a Line". The album was finally announced on March 29, which includes the three tracks on the EP, and according to a statement by Shinoda, "It's a journey out of grief and darkness, not into grief and darkness. If someone went through something like that, I hope you feel less alone. If it has not happened, I hope you feel grateful."

In May 2018, Shinoda unveiled the tracklist, which included collaborations with Blackbear, Grandson, K.Flay, Machine Gun Kelly, and Deftones frontman Chino Moreno.

Every song in the album has its own music video except for "Hold It Together". All of the album's tracks were solely produced by Shinoda.

Composition
The album begins with the three songs released on the Post Traumatic EP as the "grieving or lamenting" segment of the album. As described by Shinoda in an interview with KROQ, the album "goes from Nine Inch Nails vibes to N.W.A vibes." Some of the music is dark and grieving music while other music is upbeat and about different subjects. In an interview with Vulture, Shinoda describes,

Writing and recording
Shinoda wrote most of the music on the album himself, but songs like "About You", "Make It Up as I Go", "Lift Off" and "Running from My Shadow" were written with co-writers including: Brad Delson, Blackbear, K.Flay, Chino Moreno, Machine Gun Kelly, Ross Golan, Kevin Hissink and grandson. A leftover song from Linkin Park's last album One More Light, "Place to Start", features percussion from band member Rob Bourdon. Darren King also provided percussion for "Hold It Together". Boonn produced and provided additional guitars for "Running from My Shadow". The album, primarily being produced by Shinoda, was also provided with additional production on few tracks by BASECAMP, Andrew Dawson and Boonn.

Shinoda also stated recording this album helped him in many ways but was a difficult thing to do. As he explained to Kerrang!,

The music was recorded at Shinoda's home studio The Stockroom in Los Angeles.

Artwork and packaging
The album artwork features a signature of Shinoda over a painting of his. Shinoda was helped by Frank Maddocks, who has previously contributed to artworks for Deftones, Green Day's Revolution Radio and Linkin Park's One More Light.

The album was made available with an art book by Shinoda and Maddocks which is a double-sided 9" x 12" book includes expanded and exclusive full-color album art and images of Shinoda's painting series for "Post Traumatic" on one side, and coloring pages of original art when flipped over. The soft-cover art book was available bound with a clear O-card slipcase and includes the CD tucked inside a baby jacket.

On December 7, 2018, the vinyl edition was re-released with a bonus 10", featuring previously unreleased songs. This edition is notable with its slightly altered album artwork.

Critical reception

The album received mostly positive reviews from critics. At Metacritic, which assigns a normalized rating out of 100 to reviews from mainstream critics, the album has a positive score of 73 out of 100 based on 5 reviews, indicating "generally favorable reviews". Neil Z. Yeung of AllMusic praised the album, stating that "While Post Traumatic takes an emotional toll, it ultimately instills feelings of hope and the idea that things can get better. For Shinoda, Linkin Park, and their devoted followers, it's an effective group therapy session." In a positive review, Ilana Kaplan from the Independent called the album a "triumphant debut", giving 4 stars out of 5. Dave Simpson from The Guardian, noted that although Post Traumatic contains "flaws", he said that "its raw emotion is unusually touching and many will find it a source of tears, strength and comfort", giving 4 out of 5 stars to the album. Kerrang! praised the album altogether stating "It's an important, thoughtful album that will serve to unite the grief-stricken with a new-found sense of purpose to find some form of healing."

Track listing

Personnel
Credits adapted from the album's liner notes and AllMusic.

 Mike Shinoda – vocals, piano, guitars, bass, drums, percussion, keyboards, synthesizers, samplers, mixing, composer, art direction, paintings, producer

Additional musicians
 Rob Bourdon – percussion on 1
 Darren King – drums on 9
 Boonn – guitar on 14
 Blackbear – vocals on 5
 K.Flay – vocals on 11
 Chino Moreno  – vocals on 12
 Machine Gun Kelly – vocals on 12
 Grandson – vocals on 14

Technical
 Andrew Dawson – production
 Şerban Ghenea – mixing
 Aaron Harmon – additional production
 Jaycen Joshua – mixing
 Frank Maddocks – art direction, creative direction, design, photography
 Michelle Mancini – mastering
 Manny Marroquin – mixing
 Ethan Mates – editing
 Josh Newell – editing
 Jordan Reyes – additional production

Charts

References

2018 albums
Mike Shinoda albums
Albums produced by Mike Shinoda
Warner Records albums